William Algernon Simpson-Hinchcliffe (1880–1963) was Conservative MP for Sowerby.

He contested the seat at a by-election in 1904 and the 1906 general election.

He won the seat in 1922, but lost it to the Liberals in 1923.

Sources

Craig, FWS, ed. (1974). British Parliamentary Election Results: 1885-1918 London: Macmillan Press. p. 448. .
Whitaker's Almanack, 1905 to 1907, 1923 and 1924 editions

Conservative Party (UK) MPs for English constituencies
Politicians from Yorkshire
1880 births
1963 deaths
English justices of the peace